The Power of a Lie is a 1922 American drama film directed by George Archainbaud and written by Charles Kenyon. It is based on the 1908 novel The Power of a Lie by Johan Bojer. The film stars Mabel Julienne Scott, David Torrence, Maude George, Ruby Lafayette, Earl Metcalfe, and June Elvidge. The film was released on January 7, 1923, by Universal Pictures.

Plot
As described in a film magazine, Richard Burton (Metcalfe), engaged to Betty (Scott), the sister of his friend John Hammond (Torrence), has led a drunken and generally dissipated existence. Despite his wife Joan's (George) injunction to let Richard shift for himself, John resolves to give Richard a final chance to become respectful. He endorses Richard's note for $10,000 to let the latter start an architectural business. Richard hopes that by hard work and success to win back Betty, who has broken their engagement. Betty's determination to drop Richard is the result of her reading of a wild orgy in which he took part. John was also present at the occasion as that was when he endorsed Richard's note. In order to shield his reputation, John evades his wife's question regarding the financial aid given Richard and denies that he was at the party. John's lie leads to a big social scandal with Richard branded as a forger, and a number of complications result. One lie leads to another, and it is not until a trial takes place that vindicates Richard is the tangle straightened out. Richard reestablishes himself in Betty's favor.

Cast           
Mabel Julienne Scott as Betty Hammond
David Torrence as John Hammond
Maude George as Joan Hammond
Ruby Lafayette as Mrs. Hammond
Earl Metcalfe as Richard Burton
June Elvidge as Lily Cardington
Phillips Smalley as Jeremiah Smith
Stanton Heck as Mr. Lawrence
Winston Miller as Julian Hammond

Preservation
With no copies of The Power of a Lie located in any film archives, it is a lost film.

References

External links

1922 films
1920s English-language films
Silent American drama films
1922 drama films
Universal Pictures films
Films directed by George Archainbaud
American silent feature films
American black-and-white films
1920s American films
English-language drama films